Democratic Choice may refer to:

 Democratic Choice (Dominican Republic), a Dominican political party formed in 2015
 Democratic Choice (Israel), a minor political party in Israel formed in 1999, with Knesset membership 1999–2006
 Democratic Choice of Kazakhstan, a political party in Kazakhstan 2001–2005
 Democratic Choice of Russia, a Russian political party 1994–2001
 Democratic Choice of Russia – United Democrats, a bloc that contested the Russian legislative election, 1995
 Democratic Choice (Russia), a current political party in Russia led by Vladimir Milov

See also 
 Community of Democratic Choice, an intergovernmental organization established in 2005 by nine European states